This is a list of the first qualified female dentist to practice in each country, where that is known.

Africa

Americas

Asia

Europe

Oceania

See also
 List of first female pharmacists by country
 List of first female physicians by country
 Women in dentistry
 Women in medicine

References

Country
Dentists
Dentists